Choi Shin-hee (married name Fears; born, March 21, 1983) is a South Korean female boxer. She competed professionally since 2004 and is a former 2005-2006 IFBA Flyweight Champion. She was defeated in 2007 by Elena Reid. She retired in 2008 and owns the Seongnam Boxing Gym.  Her boxing nickname was “The Beauty”.

Early life and education

Choi was born on March 21, 1983 in Seoul, South Korea. She started to train in boxing in 2002 for dieting and exercise when she was 19, and began an amateur career under coach Sang Kwon Park in 2002. She attended  Yongin University from 2005 to 2009.

Boxing career
Choi was a 2003 Amateur Boxing Gold medalist and had earned an amateur record of 6-1 when she decided to go professional in 2003.  She won the KBC Korean World Championship by 2004 against Jin-Young Kim.

In 2005 Choi traveled to China to face Maribel Zurita for the IFBA Flyweight World Championship and won by split-decision.  Eight months later she successfully defended and won the IFBA Flyweight World Championship in Seongnam City against Jet Izumi of Japan. In 2006, she was awarded a Korean Presidential Citation from President Roh Moo-Hyun.  She also became a Boxing Coach for the Korean Air Force Academy.

In 2007, with a record of nine fights and eight wins, Choi fought Elena Reid in Temecula, California losing the title by decision.

In 2007 was a boxing commentator on MBC, ESPN, and KBS N Sports.

Other career events
Choi was on variety of TV programs and in magazine articles. 
 
TV programs:  XTM “Go Super Korean”, a Japanese variety show called TBS Kunoichi, and KBS “Star Golden Bell”.  She was also on Yoon Dohyun’s “Love Letters”.
Magazines:  Choi was featured in Vogue Korea, GM Daewu, Allure, Men's Health, Adidas Stella Macartney, Diet Friends, Dove, Ecole, and Ceci. Magazines
She was also featured in a 2010 music video from the South Korean Musician CHO PD.

Professional boxing record

References

External links
BoxRec profile

1983 births
People from Seongnam
Living people
South Korean women boxers
Boxing commentators
World boxing champions
Lightweight boxers
Sportspeople from Gyeonggi Province